A Mojo Books is a company that produced books, in e-book PDF format, based on the output of a given band, singer or composer. Its creators were the Brazilian editors Danilo Corci and Ricardo Giassetti, with the aid of the cover artist Delfin.

During the mid-1990s, Corci and Giassetti formed a synthpop band called Toward the Cathedral along with composer Will Geraldo. The lyrics for the band's songs were usually based on such writers as James Joyce, Ernest Hemingway, Franz Kafka, Edgar Allan Poe and Marcel Proust. Ten years later they decided to turn music into literature and by the end of 2006 Corci and Giassetti had established the Mojo Books project to produce e-books based on records. Writers have ranged from amateurs to professional writers and academics.

Available e-books

 Black Celebration - Depeche Mode by Danilo Corci
 Technique - New Order, by Ricardo Giassetti
 #1 Record - Big Star, by Luiz Cesar Pimentel
 In it for the Money - Supergrass, by Delfin
 Revolver - The Beatles, by Jota Wagner
 Dummy - Portishead, by Ludmila Azevedo
 Doolittle - The Pixies, by Marcelo Costa
 Comes a Time - Neil Young, by CEL
 Thriller - Michael Jackson, by Rodrigo James
 The Life Pursuit - Belle & Sebastian, by Paulo F.
 Dressed up like Nebraska - Josh Rouse, by Mariana Tramontina
 Racional - Tim Maia, by Mariel Reis
 Transformer - Lou Reed, by Mariangela Carvalho
 Volume 1 - Bauhaus, by Heitor Werneck
 Pet Sounds - Beach Boys, by Helio Flanders
 American IV - Johnny Cash, by Pablo Melgar
 Endtroducing - DJ Shadow, by Filipe Luna
 World Clique - Deee-Lite, by Guilherme Choovanski
 Cartola 74 - Caetola, by Igor Capelatto
 Ziggy Stardust - David Bowie, by Maria Lutterbach
 Samba Esquema Noise - Mondo Livre S/A, by André Gamma
 Tabula Rasa - Einstürzende Neubauten, by J. Bernucci
 Like a Prayer - Madonna, by Alex Oliveira

References

External links
Mojo Books website

Ebooks